Masjid Omar Kampong Melaka (or Omar Kampong Malacca Mosque; Jawi: مسجد عمر کامڤوڠ ملاک) is a mosque in Singapore, and is located at Keng Cheow Street in the Singapore River Planning Area, within the Central Area, Singapore's central business district.

The mosque is owned by Majlis Ugama Islam Singapura.

Transportation
The mosque is accessible from Clarke Quay MRT station.

See also
Islamic architecture
List of first mosques by country
List of mosques in Singapore

References

National Heritage Board (2002), Singapore's 100 Historic Places, Archipelago Press,

External links

eCitizen website
National Heritage Board website
GoogleMaps StreetView of Masjid Omar Kampong Melaka

1820 establishments in Singapore
Mosques completed in 1820
Omar Kampong Melaka
Singapore River
Tourist attractions in Singapore
19th-century architecture in Singapore